Louis Schoorl (born 23 December 1976) is a Dutch-born Australian songwriter, composer, producer and multi-instrumentalist.

Career
Based in Sydney, Australia, Schoorl has written or produced for 5 Seconds of Summer, Taylor Henderson, Jessica Mauboy, Girls' Generation, Stan Walker, The Fooo, Dami Im, Guy Sebastian, 360, Pez and M-Phazes. He's worked alongside singer-songwriters including Daniel Johns, Tina Arena, De La Soul, Delta Goodrem, The Veronicas, Kimbra, Bertie Blackman, Benjamin Francis Leftwich, Georgie Kay and Mike Rosenberg aka Passenger.

Schoorl songs have topped the Swedish, Japanese and Australian Charts including runner-up of The X Factor Australia, Taylor Henderson's "Borrow My Heart".

On a trip to Stockholm Louis wrote a song with Erik Lewander and Ylva Dimberg of The Kennel that was released by Girls' Generation on their Japanese album Love and Peace. The track "My Oh My" has notched up more than 20 million YouTube views. Girls' Generation have set a new record by becoming the first Korean girl group to top the Oricon Weekly Album Chart twice with their 3rd Japanese full-length album Love & Peace.

Schoorl won Breakthrough Songwriter of the Year at the 2014 APRA Awards held in Brisbane in recognition of a hot stretch in 2013 during which he wrote, co-wrote and produced 88 songs, collaborating with such acts as 360, Daniel Johns, Taylor Henderson and Jessica Mauboy. Schoorl is signed to a worldwide publishing deal with Disney Music Publishing.

Schoorl co-wrote the original song "Gotcha" for the Australian film The Sapphires with Ilan Kidron and the film's star, Jessica Mauboy. The film's soundtrack was nominated for an ARIA Music Award for the Best Original Soundtrack and Best Pop Release. Jessica Mauboy also received an ARIA Nomination for Best Female Artist for "Gotcha".

In 2018 he co-wrote the Swedish entry for that year's Eurovision Song Contest, Dance You Off

Discography

Singles

Albums

Extended plays

Certification

Awards and nominations

References

External links
Louis Schoorl at Disney Music Publishing

1976 births
APRA Award winners
Australian songwriters
Dutch emigrants to Australia
Living people
Musicians from Sydney